Clarksville is a community in the Canadian province of Nova Scotia, located in the Municipal District of East Hants in Hants County.

References
Clarksville on Destination Nova Scotia

Communities in Hants County, Nova Scotia
General Service Areas in Nova Scotia